Selima was one of the most important Thoroughbred horses of the 18th century and became one of the foundation mares of the American Thoroughbred.  She was imported to the Province of Maryland between 1750 and 1752 by Benjamin Tasker, Jr.

Racing
In 1752, Selima won the biggest prize of the era, 2,500 pistoles at Gloucester, Virginia which marked "the beginning of the remarkable racing contests between the rival colonies of Maryland and Virginia."

Legacy
She produced 10 foals including Selim, Ebony and Stella.

The annual Selima Stakes, now raced at Laurel Park Racecourse, was named after Selima in 1926 and first held at the Maryland State Fair with a $30,000 challenge cup for two-year-old fillies.

See also
Dungannon
 Maryland Jockey Club

References

External links
 Selima at Pedigree Query Retrieved August 2012

1745 racehorse births
Thoroughbred family 21
Racehorses bred in the Kingdom of Great Britain
Racehorses trained in the United States